Thomas Snagge (1536–1593) was a Member of Parliament, barrister and landowner who served as Speaker of the English House of Commons, Attorney General for Ireland and as Queen's Sergeant.

Life
Snagge was born in 1536 in Letchworth. He was the son of Thomas Snagge, the prosperous lord of the manor of Marston Moretaine in Bedfordshire. He studied law at Gray's Inn, and after being called to the bar in 1554 practiced law in London.

Snagge was elected as a knight of the shire for Bedfordshire in 1571. He was chosen by Queen Elizabeth to be Attorney General for Ireland and held this appointment from 1577 to 1580. The Queen chose him because he had a reputation for efficiency, and "the public service had been not a little hindered through the default and insufficiency of m the [Irish] law officers" and "her Majesty thought that a person well-chosen in England might be sent over". Snagge as it turned out was not particularly well-chosen: he had not wanted the job and disliked living in Ireland and, according to a modern writer, his official correspondence is simply a long list of complaints. In particular, he complained of the inefficiency of the Master of the Rolls in Ireland, Nicholas White, and went so far as to make an official complaint against him to the Privy Council of England. In 1580 he was appointed a Serjeant-at-law (Ireland).

In 1586 Snagge was again returned as one of the members of parliament for Bedfordshire and in 1589 for the borough of Bedford. In 1589 he was elected as Speaker of the House of Commons and in 1590 was promoted to Queen's Serjeant. As well as owning several manors in Bedfordshire, his home seat was at Marston Moretaine.

Snagge died in 1593 and was entombed in St Mary's Church, Marston Moretaine, where an alabaster tomb carrying effigies of him and his wife survives. He had married Elizabeth, daughter and coheiress of Thomas Dickons of Marston Moretaine; they had five sons and two daughters. He was succeeded by his eldest son, Thomas, also a member of parliament (for Bedford in 1586).

References

History of Parliament SNAGGE, Thomas I (1536-93) of Marston Mortaine, Beds

|-

1536 births
1593 deaths
People from Letchworth
Members of Gray's Inn
Speakers of the House of Commons of England
Serjeants-at-law (England)
English lawyers
English knights
English MPs 1571
English MPs 1586–1587
English MPs 1589
16th-century English lawyers
People from Marston Moreteyne
Serjeants-at-law (Ireland)